Mike Schatz is an American creative director, copywriter, actor, and comedian. He is best known as the voice of Emory the Plutonian on the Adult Swim series Aqua Teen Hunger Force and the film; Aqua Teen Hunger Force Colon Movie Film for Theaters. In addition, he worked on creative direction for the Atlanta Braves, the Up TV station, and other clients from the Blue Sky Agency, an advertising agency based in Atlanta, Georgia.

Schatz is a cast member at Dad's Garage Theatre Company, where he wrote the shows V.I.P. Room, Apnea, and King of Pops: The Post Apocalyptic Musical.

Acting

See also
Andy Merrill
List of Aqua Teen Hunger Force characters

References

External links
Mike Schatz at the Internet Movie Database

Year of birth missing (living people)
Living people
American male voice actors